Aaj Ki Awaaz is a 1984 Indian Hindi-language action drama film produced by B. R. Chopra and directed by Ravi Chopra. The film stars Raj Babbar, Smita Patil, Nana Patekar, and Vijay Arora. The film's music is by Ravi. The film is based on 1982 Hollywood movie Death Wish II. It tells the story of a professor who becomes a vigilante after his sister is raped and his mother is killed. This film was remade in Telugu in 1985 as Nyayam Meere Cheppali, in Tamil in 1985 as Naan Sigappu Manithan and in Kannada as Mahatma.
 
The censor-board certificate of the movie shows 'Re-revised', implying that censor board objected to certain scenes of the movie, and cleared the movie when it was re-edited. The producers of the movie have been subsequently criticized by many for filming sexual assault scenes in a gratuitous way.

Plot 
Professor Prabhat Kumar Varma (Raj Babbar), lives with his widowed mom, and sister, Madhu (Raksha Chauhan), in Andheri, Mumbai. He is worried about the growing crime rates in the city. He meets the Police Commissioner Sathe (Chandrashekhar) and complains about it. Meanwhile, Prabhat's friend Professor Lalwani (Dheeraj Kumar)'s sister-in-law, Sudha (Sonika Gill), is abducted, raped and killed. Her rapist and killer, Suresh Thakur (Dalip Tahil), is arrested and presented in court. His lawyers manage to prove that Suresh was not in Mumbai during the incident. The court subsequently acquits him. Annoyed by Prabhat's persistence about getting justice for Sudha, Suresh Thakur along with his gang barges into Prabhat's apartment and after tying him up, gangrapes his sister in front of him. They also murder his mother when she tries to call the police. His sister subsequently commits suicide. Prabhat loses faith in the criminal justice system. To avenge the death of his family, Prabhat turns into a vigilante. Every night he roams the city killing rapists and murderers. Inspector Shafi (Shafi Inamdar) starts investigating these crimes and soon Prabhat comes under the police's radar. The inspector eventually manages to capture Prabhat. Prabhat's girlfriend Rajni (Smita Patil) who is a lawyer takes it upon herself to free him and get justice once and for all.

Cast
Raj Babbar as Prof. Prabhat Kumar Varma
Smita Patil as Public Prosecutor Rajni V. Deshmukh
Nana Patekar as Jagmohandas
Om Shivpuri as Judge
Dheeraj Kumar as Prof. Lalwani
Shafi Inamdar as Inspector Shafi
Vijay Arora as Srivastava
Arun Bakshi as Inspector Veerkar
Ashalata as Mrs. V.V. Deshmukh
Chandrashekhar as Police Commissioner Sathe
Iftekhar as Judge V.V. Deshmukh
Alok Nath as Hotel (bar owner)
Gufi Paintal as Orderly in Mental Hospital
Dalip Tahil as Suresh Thakur
Dinesh Thakur as Advocate Dayal
Chandni as Sudha's friend
Deepak Qazir as Kishan Khanna
Sonika Gill as Sudha Advani
Urmila Bhatt as Mrs. Varma
Raksha Chauhan as Madhu, Prof. Prabhat's sister who gets raped and killed.
Om Katare as Villain

Crew
Director: Ravi Chopra
Producer: B. R. Chopra
Banner: B R Films

Music

Awards

 32nd Filmfare Awards:
Won
 Best Lyricist – Hasan Kamal for "Aaj Ki Awaaz"

Nominated

 Best Film – B. R. Films
 Best Director – Ravi Chopra
 Best Actor – Raj Babbar
 Best Actress – Smita Patil
 Best Supporting Actor – Shafi Inamdar
 Best Story – Shabd Kumar

Notes

References

External links

1984 films
1980s Hindi-language films
Films scored by Ravi
Films directed by Ravi Chopra
Hindi films remade in other languages
Indian courtroom films
Indian rape and revenge films
Indian vigilante films
Films about rape in India
Hindi-language action films
1980s vigilante films
Muhammad Iqbal